Sergei Vladimirovich Khripunkov (born 17 March 1982) is a former Russian professional football player.

Club career
He played in the Russian Football National League for FC Metallurg Lipetsk in 2000.

References

External links
 Career summary by sportbox.ru
 

1982 births
Sportspeople from Lipetsk
Living people
Russian footballers
Association football midfielders
FC Metallurg Lipetsk players
FC Spartak Tambov players
FC Okean Nakhodka players